James A. Elam was an American football coach. He served as the head football coach at Transylvania University in Lexington, Kentucky from 1927 to 1929 and Western Kentucky State Teachers College–—known as Western Kentucky University)—from 1930 to 1931.

Elam was a graduate of Sewanee: The University of the South.

Head coaching record

College

References

Year of birth missing
Year of death missing
Transylvania Pioneers football coaches
Western Kentucky Hilltoppers football coaches
High school football coaches in Tennessee
Sewanee: The University of the South alumni